Campanula barbata, common name bearded bellflower, is a perennial flowering plant in the bellflower family Campanulaceae.

Description
This plant produces a small basal rosette of grayish-green leaves, simple, lanceolate with dentate margins and alternate. It has racemes of nodding, pale blue to deep blue campanulate flowers, which are hairy inside (hence the Latin name barbata, meaning bearded). They bloom from June to August.

Distribution
This species is native to Norway, France, Italy and Central Europe.

Habitat

References

 Christoper Brickell (Editor-in-chief): RHS A-Z Encyclopedia of Garden Plants. Third edition. Dorling Kindersley, London 2003

External links
Biolib
Luirig.altervista
Global Biodiversity Information Facility

barbata
Alpine flora